This page records the details of the Japan national football team in 2000.

Results

Players statistics

External links
Japan Football Association

Japan national football team results
2000 in Japanese football
Japan